This is a list of Number 1 hit singles in 1971 in New Zealand, starting with the first chart dated, 15 January 1971.

Chart 

Key
 – Single of New Zealand origin

External links
 The Official NZ Music Chart, RIANZ website

1971 in New Zealand
1971 record charts
1971
1970s in New Zealand music